Do Kuheh-ye Rashnow (also Romanized as Do Kūheh-ye Rashnow; also known as Do Kūheh) is a village in Jayedar Rural District, in the Central District of Pol-e Dokhtar County, Lorestan Province, Iran. At the 2006 census, its population was 225, in 47 families.

References 

Towns and villages in Pol-e Dokhtar County